Mental health first aid is a training program that teaches members of the public how to help a person who is experiencing varying degrees of worsening mental health issues. Like traditional first aid, mental health first aid does not teach people to treat or diagnose mental health or substance use conditions. Instead, the training teaches people how to offer initial support until appropriate professional help is received or until the crisis resolves.

History
The first Mental Health First Aid (MHFA) training program was developed in Australia in 2001 by a research team led by Betty Kitchener and Anthony Jorm. The program was created to teach members of the general public how to provide initial support to people experiencing mental health problems, as well as to connect them with appropriate professional help and community resources. MHFA training programs have been implemented in 26 countries around the world, including the United States, Canada, the United Kingdom, Ireland, and a number of other European, Asian, and African countries.

Rationale
According to the founders of Mental Health First Aid (MHFA), they tested the idea that giving first aid for mental health could lessen the effects of mental health problems, speed up recovery, and make suicide less likely by educating students on common mental health crises. These include feelings of suicide, deliberate self-harm, panic attacks, or symptoms of psychosis, and how to deal with these situations.  The idea was to reduce the stigma associated with mental illness and make it more likely that people with mental health problems would seek help, which would reduce the risk of the person coming to harm.

Curriculum 
The curriculum for Mental Health First Aid (MHFA) typically includes the following topics:

 Participants learn about the common symptoms associated with depression, anxiety, schizophrenia, bipolar disorder, and eating disorders, as well as a general overview of mental health and mental illnesses.

 Participants are educated on the common warning signs of mental illnesses, such as mood, behavior, and cognitive changes.
 Participants learn about local counseling and psychiatric services, and how to help others gain access to them. 

Using the knowledge from those topics, participants are educated on a 5-step action plan for providing mental health first aid, including the following:

 Evaluate the risk of suicide or harm
 Listen non-judgmentally
 Provide reassurance
 Encourage appropriate professional assistance
 Promote self-help and additional support strategies

There may be additional modules that target specific populations, such as children and adolescents, the elderly, or veterans, depending on the program. There may be a module that focuses on substance use disorder and its related issues and challenges, depending on the program. All of these topics are covered in order to equip participants with the knowledge, skills, and confidence necessary to recognize and respond appropriately to signs of mental illness and substance use disorders.

Research on mental health first aid training
A number of systematic reviews and meta-analyses have been carried out to review data concerning the effectiveness of mental health first aid (MHFA) training on participants' knowledge of mental health conditions and subsequent helping behaviors. 

A meta-analysis conducted in 2014 concluded that mental health first aid training increases participants' knowledge of mental health, reduces their negative views, and increases their supportive behaviors toward people with mental health issues.

A meta-analysis conducted in 2018 concluded that mental health first aid training was found to enhance participants' knowledge, awareness, and beliefs about successful treatments for mental diseases. At follow-up, there were slight improvements in the amount of assistance provided to a person with a mental health problem, but the nature of the change in the offered behaviors was unclear.  

A systematic review conducted in 2020 showed that MHFA had conflicting effects on how trainees applied the skills they learned, but no influence on how beneficial their actions were for the mental health of the recipients.  

A systematic review conducted in 2020 focused on on youth and adolescent MHFA and found significant improvements in the understanding, recognition, stigmatizing perceptions, helping motivations, and helping behavior of youth and adolescent participants. The most frequently stated improvement was in knowledge and confidence, while the least frequently reported improvement was in helping behavior.

By country

Australia
Mental Health First Aid Australia (MHFA Australia) is a non-profit organization in Australia that offers training and certification in Mental Health First Aid since the inception of MHFA in 2000.

England
In England, Mental Health First Aid is offered by Mental Health First Aid (England) which is a Community Interest Company (CIC), a social enterprise that offers MHFA training and certification since 2007.

United States
In the U.S., Mental Health First Aid (MHFA) is sponsored by the National Council for Mental Wellbeing, a non-profit which is the biggest group in the United States that certifies Mental Health First Aid instructors since 2008.They have trained more than 2 million people in MHFA.

Canada
In Canada, Mental Health First Aid (MHFA) was introduced in 2007 and is taught and certified by the Mental Health Commission of Canada (MHCC), which is a non-profit organization.

Hong Kong 
In Hong Kong, Mental Health First Aid (MHFA) was introduced in 2004 and is taught and certified by the Mental Health Association of Hong Kong, which is a non-profit organization.

See also 
 Mental health triage - A brief overview of the Australian concept for dealing with psychiatric emergencies, similar to regular triage.
Medically indigent adult
Political abuse of psychiatry
Involuntary commitment

References and notes

Mental disorders
First aid